Sami Välimäki (born 16 July 1998) is a Finnish professional golfer who plays on the European Tour. On his 6th European Tour start he won the 2020 Oman Open.

Amateur career
During 2018 Välimäki was selected for the Europe team in the Bonallack Trophy and for the Continent of Europe team in the St Andrews Trophy. He played for the Finnish team that won the 2018 European Amateur Team Championship and represented Finland in the 2018 Eisenhower Trophy. He reached as high as 10th in the World Amateur Golf Ranking during 2018. While still an amateur, Välimäki also played a number of Nordic Golf League events during 2017 and 2018.

Professional career
Välimäki turned professional in early 2019 after the completion of his military service in Finland. He played mostly on the Pro Golf Tour during 2019. He won his first professional victory in February at the Open Casa Green Golf in Morocco. He won twice more on the tour in August and also won the end-of-season Castanea Resort Championship for his fourth win of the season. Despite his four wins he only finished second in the Order of Merit.

After his third win on the 2019 Pro Golf Tour, Välimäki earned a place on the Challenge Tour, but later he qualified for the main European Tour for 2020 by finishing 8th in qualifying school. In his fifth start of the 2020 season he won the Oman Open, beating Brandon Stone in a playoff.

Amateur wins
2016 Ticino Championship, Finnish Junior Match Play Under-18
2017 Portuguese International Amateur Championship, Ticino Championship

Source:

Professional wins (6)

European Tour wins (1)

European Tour playoff record (1–0)

Pro Golf Tour wins (4)

Finnish Tour wins (1)

Results in major championships
Results not in chronological order in 2020.

CUT = missed the half-way cut

NT = No tournament due to COVID-19 pandemic

Results in World Golf Championships

1Cancelled due to COVID-19 pandemic

"T" = Tied
NT = No tournament

Team appearances
Amateur
European Boys' Team Championship (representing Finland): 2015, 2016
European Amateur Team Championship (representing Finland): 2018 (winners)
Bonallack Trophy (representing Europe): 2018
St Andrews Trophy (representing the Continent of Europe): 2018 (winners)
Eisenhower Trophy (representing Finland): 2018

See also
2019 European Tour Qualifying School graduates

References

External links

Finnish male golfers
European Tour golfers
Olympic golfers of Finland
Golfers at the 2020 Summer Olympics
Sportspeople from Pirkanmaa
People from Nokia, Finland
1998 births
Living people
21st-century Finnish people